Psammorygma is a genus of African ant spiders found in the deserts of southern Africa, namely the Kalahari desert and the Namib desert. They are somewhat larger spiders, growing up to twenty millimeters in length. The carapace and chelicerae are brightly colored, while the legs and abdomen are generally a darker black or gray. They can be distinguished from other genera by a knob-like proximal extension found on the cheliceral fang and a double row of dorsal spines in a specific location. First described in 1991 by Jocqué, the name is from the Greek psammon, meaning "sand", and orugma, meaning "mine", in reference to the sandy tunnels these spiders live in. , it contains only three species: P. aculeatum, P. caligatum, and P. rutilans.

References

Zodariidae
Araneomorphae genera
Spiders of Africa